Kensington is an inner city area of Liverpool, England, immediately to the east of the city centre, bordered by Everton to the north, Fairfield to the east and Edge Hill to the south.

The majority of Kensington is in the Kensington and Fairfield ward, while the westernmost part, Kensington Fields, is in the Central ward. At the 2001 Census, Kensington had a population of 12,740.

Description
The area is occupied largely by Victorian terraced houses.  A number of local shops, including newsagents and convenience stores as well as some supermarkets exist along Kensington, Prescot Road and Edge Lane, the area's three main roads.  Many shop fronts have been refurbished by the Government's New Deal for Communities programme.  The area boasts a number of traditional Liverpool pubs.  Kensington is also home to the historic Deane Road Jewish Cemetery, which was awarded £494,000 in 2010 by the Heritage Lottery Fund to aid restoration.

Due to its close proximity to the Knowledge Quarter of Liverpool, Kensington has developed into a popular student quarter, composed mainly of University of Liverpool and Liverpool John Moores University students. In 2001, 12.29% of the population of Kensington were registered students.

The northwestern area of Kensington features a series of streets named in honour of the Beatles, which opened during the early 1980s; these include: John Lennon Drive, Paul McCartney Way, George Harrison Close, Ringo Starr Drive, Epstein Court, Apple Court and Cavern Court.
Kensington is home to Newsham Park, a historic grade two listed park, in a conservation area. Opened in 1868, it is the first park of the three sisters of Newsham, Sefton, and Stanley Park. Three of the five entrances of this park are in Kensington, those being the main entrance on Sheil Road and the other two on Prescot Road.

Community and regeneration

Since 2000, money from the Kensington Regeneration programme has allowed improvements to be made to the area, with run-down houses redeveloped, and street monitors put in place to maintain social order.

Kensington Vision, a project funded by Mersey Broadband and co-ordinated by Liverpool John Moores University, ran from 2005 to 2006. It gave away 150 free broadband connections and internet-enabled Freeview set-top boxes, developing a community web hub and training the local community in web design and video editing and production skills. It also hosts an abandoned Jewish cemetery in Deene Road.

Transport
There are regular buses (numbers 8, 9, 10 and variants thereof) providing services to the city centre, as well as to Huyton and St Helens.

Notable residents
 Terence Davies, screenwriter and filmmaker.
 Natasha Hamilton, singer
 John Head, musician 
 Mick Head, musician
 Paul Mason, football player.
 Joe McGann, actor.
 Mark McGann, actor, director, and musician.
 Paul McGann, actor.
 Stephen McGann, actor.
 Ian McNabb, musician.
 David Morrissey, actor and director.
 Percy Phillips, studio owner and recording engineer
 Sydney Silverman, Labour MP
 Phil Thompson, football player
 Colin Welland, actor and film director.
 Eddie Youds, Everton F.C., football player.

Cultural references

Music
On 14 July 1958, John Lennon, Paul McCartney, George Harrison and other members of the Quarrymen skiffle group, which later evolved into the Beatles, made their first sound recording at Phillips' Sound Recording Services studio located at 38 Kensington, Kensington, Liverpool. John Lennon Drive is a street in Kensington.

The Kensington area is also referred to in the song Streets of Kenny on the H.M.S. Fable album by Liverpudlian band Shack.

Television
Millionaire John Elliott spent ten days in the district living in a council flat under state benefits as part of the Channel 4 programme The Secret Millionaire (episode broadcast 6 December 2006). He assisted a family living in a council house as well as paying several thousand pounds to a local asylum centre. Strictly, the road he lived on throughout his stay, Balmoral Road, is in the Fairfield district.  Shots of boarded up houses, edited into the film to support the opinion from a local person that there was little sign of regeneration in Kensington, were actually from the Gladstone Road area of Edge Hill district and were scheduled for demolition (currently underway).  The person being interviewed was at the time on Balmoral Road, approx 1 mile away.

See also

Christ Church, Kensington

References

External links

Liverpool City Council, Ward Profile: Kensington & Fairfield
Liverpool Street Gallery – Liverpool 6
Liverpool Street Gallery – Liverpool 7

Areas of Liverpool